The 2000 William Hill Greyhound Derby took place during May and June with the final being held on 3 June 2000 at Wimbledon Stadium. The winner Rapid Ranger received £75,000. One of the finalists Smoking Bullet was owned by Vinnie Jones.

Final result 
At Wimbledon (over 480 metres):

Distances 
3¼, 1¾, head, 6½, 2 (lengths)
The distances between the greyhounds are in finishing order and shown in lengths. One length is equal to 0.08 of one second.

Competition Report
Four greyhounds were installed as 16-1 joint favourites in the ante post lists; they were Juvenile and Byrne International winner Knockanroe Rover,  Laurels, All England Cup and Birmingham Cup champion Derbay Flyer, Eclipse champion Mumble Swerve and the Nick Savva trained Sonic Flight.
In the final Rapid Ranger vied for the lead with Deerfield Sunset on his inside before Rapid Ranger pulled clear and won easily.

Quarter finals

Semi finals

See also
2000 UK & Ireland Greyhound Racing Year

References

Greyhound Derby
English Greyhound Derby